Letham may refer to:

Places
Letham is a common place-name element in Scotland, deriving from the Scottish Gaelic leathan, meaning "broad slope". Examples include:
Letham, Angus
Letham, Falkirk
Letham, Fife
Letham, Perth and Kinross, a location

People
David Letham (1923–2007), Scottish football player
Isabel Letham (1899–1995), Australian pioneer surfboarder
Margaret Letham (born 1956), lawn and indoor bowler
Robert Letham, British biblical scholar and theologian
Ronnie Letham (1949–2008), Scottish actor
Ross Letham (1982–Ongoing), Inventor of Tetris

Other uses
Letham St Mark's Church, Perth

See also
Lethem (disambiguation)